The 22nd annual Screen Awards are the annual Star Screen Awards held to honor the best films of 2015 from the Hindi-language film industry (commonly known as Bollywood). The ceremony was held on  hosted by actor Kapil Sharma and Karan Johar.

Awards 
The winners and nominees have been listed below. Winners are listed first, highlighted in boldface, and indicated with a double dagger.

Jury Awards

Technical Awards

Popular  Choice Awards

Special Jury Awards

References

External links 
 The Screen Awards (2016) at the Internet Movie Database

Screen Awards